USS LSM-247 was a United States Navy landing ship of World War II.

References

Ships built in Los Angeles
1944 ships
LSM-1-class landing ships medium